Amblyeleotris is a genus of fish in the family Gobiidae found throughout the Indo-Pacific region. This is the largest genus of the shrimp gobies or prawn gobies, so-called because of their symbiotic relationship with certain alpheid shrimps. The shrimp excavates and maintains a burrow used by both animals while the goby, which has far superior eyesight, acts as a lookout for predators. The shrimp maintains almost constant contact with the fish with an antenna. Fossil Amblyeleotris otoliths have been found together with alpheid shrimp remnants from as early as late early Miocene (Burdigalian) suggesting a possible mutualistic association since then. 

The species of Amblyeleotris vary considerably in size from less than 30 mm to almost 200 mm standard length.

Species
There are currently 39 recognized species in this genus:
 Amblyeleotris arcupinna Mohlmann & Munday, 1999 (Arc-fin shrimpgoby)
 Amblyeleotris aurora (Polunin & Lubbock, 1977) (Pink-bar prawngoby)
 Amblyeleotris bellicauda J. E. Randall, 2004
 Amblyeleotris biguttata J. E. Randall, 2004 (Twin-spot shrimpgoby)
 Amblyeleotris bleekeri I. S. Chen, K. T. Shao & J. P. Chen, 2006 
 Amblyeleotris callopareia Polunin & Lubbock, 1979 (Beautiful-cheek shrimpgoby)
 Amblyeleotris cephalotaenia (Y. Ni, 1989)
 Amblyeleotris delicatulus J. L. B. Smith, 1958
 Amblyeleotris diagonalis Polunin & Lubbock, 1979 (Diagonal shrimpgoby)
 Amblyeleotris downingi J. E. Randall, 1994 (Downing's shrimpgoby)
 Amblyeleotris ellipse J. E. Randall, 2004
 Amblyeleotris fasciata (Herre, 1953) (Red-banded prawngoby)
 Amblyeleotris fontanesii (Bleeker, 1853) (Giant prawngoby)
 Amblyeleotris guttata (Fowler, 1938) (Spotted prawngoby)
 Amblyeleotris gymnocephala (Bleeker, 1853) (Masked shrimpgoby)
 Amblyeleotris harrisorum Mohlmann & J. E. Randall, 2002
 Amblyeleotris japonica Takagi, 1957
 Amblyeleotris latifasciata Polunin & Lubbock, 1979 (Wide-barred shrimpgoby)
 Amblyeleotris macronema Polunin & Lubbock, 1979 (Long-spine shrimpgoby)
 Amblyeleotris marquesas Mohlmann & J. E. Randall, 2002
 Amblyeleotris masuii Aonuma & Yoshino, 1996 (Masui's shrimpgoby)
 Amblyeleotris melanocephala Aonuma, Iwata & Yoshino, 2000 (Black-head shrimpgoby)
 Amblyeleotris memnonia Prokofiev, 2016 
 Amblyeleotris morishitai Senou & Aonuma, 2007
 Amblyeleotris neglecta Jaafar & J. E. Randall, 2009 
 Amblyeleotris neumanni J. E. Randall & Earle, 2006
 Amblyeleotris novaecaledoniae Goren, 1981
 Amblyeleotris ogasawarensis Yanagisawa, 1978 (Red-spotted shrimpgoby)
 Amblyeleotris periophthalma (Bleeker, 1853) (Broad-banded shrimpgoby)
 Amblyeleotris randalli Hoese & Steene, 1978 (Randall's prawngoby)
 Amblyeleotris rhyax Polunin & Lubbock, 1979 (Volcano shrimpgoby)
 Amblyeleotris rubrimarginata Mohlmann & J. E. Randall, 2002 (Red-margin shrimpgoby)
 Amblyeleotris steinitzi (Klausewitz, 1974) (Steinitz' prawngoby)
 Amblyeleotris stenotaeniata J. E. Randall, 2004
 Amblyeleotris sungami (Klausewitz, 1969) (Magnus' prawngoby)
 Amblyeleotris taipinensis I. S. Chen, K. T. Shao & J. P. Chen, 2006
 Amblyeleotris triguttata J. E. Randall, 1994 (Triple-spot shrimpgoby)
 Amblyeleotris wheeleri (Polunin & Lubbock, 1977) (Gorgeous prawngoby)
 Amblyeleotris yanoi Aonuma & Yoshino, 1996 (Flag-tail shrimpgoby)
 Amblyeleotris kireedam Carolin, Bajpai, Maurya & Schwarzhans, 2022 (otolith based fossil species)

References

 
Gobiinae
Taxa named by Pieter Bleeker